John Brendan McNally (22 January 1935 — 6 July 2011), known as Brendan McNally, was an Irish professional footballer who played as a defender.

Career
Born in Dublin, McNally first played football for a small local club, St. Finbarrs. As a schoolboy he was selected to play for Ireland against England in a schoolboy international, scoring one of Ireland's goals as they went down 3–2.

He was a right back and began his professional career in the League of Ireland with  Shelbourne F.C. in 1954 and then moved to Luton Town F.C. in 1956.

There he stayed for eight years, making 134 appearances and scoring three times. Luton were then a First Division team and in 1959 he was part of the Luton team that lost 2–1 to Nottingham Forest in the final of the F.A. Cup. One of the Forest scorers that day was Roy Dwight, who was later carried off after breaking his leg in a tackle with Brendan. Roy, who died in 2003, was the cousin of the singer/songwriter Sir Elton John.

After a successful period in the First Division, Luton started to slip down the Football League, first into the Second Division and shortly before Brendan joined Cambridge City in 1963 they were relegated into the Third Division.

Brendan later on played for Dunstable Town and managed non league Chesham United where he gave future England international Kerry Dixon his first start in senior football.

He also played three times for the Republic of Ireland, winning his first cap in a 2–0 European Championship qualifier win over Czechoslovakia on 5 April 1959 in Dalymount Park.

References

External links 

1935 births
2011 deaths
Republic of Ireland association footballers
Association football defenders
Republic of Ireland international footballers
Republic of Ireland B international footballers
Shelbourne F.C. players
Luton Town F.C. players
Cambridge City F.C. players
Dunstable Town F.C. players
League of Ireland players
English Football League players
Chesham United F.C. managers
Republic of Ireland football managers
FA Cup Final players